Ischigualastia is an extinct genus of large dicynodont therapsids that lived during the Late Carnian age and the Early Norian age of the Late Triassic Period. The genus was found in and named after the Ischigualasto Formation (Cancha de Bochas Member) of the Ischigualasto-Villa Unión Basin in northwestern Argentina. It has been placed in the family Stahleckeriidae.

Description 

The genus is described as an enormous dicynodont, with a short, high skull, and lacking tusks.

Paleoecology 
It was a large quadrupedal herbivore, most common at the base of the Ischigualasto Formation.
It was a common member of the local fauna, although not as abundant as the medium-sized herbivores Hyperodapedon and Exaeretodon. The only danger to such a huge animal was the almost equally large carnivorous pseudosuchian Saurosuchus and perhaps the predatory dinosaur Herrerasaurus, which shared the same environment. It is likely that pressure from this predator pushed Ischigualastia into extinction, for it becomes less common and finally disappears in the higher levels of the Ischigualasto Formation. A somewhat relative, Placerias, survived in Laurasia.

Gallery

See also 
 Stahleckeriidae
 List of therapsids

References

External links 
 

Dicynodonts
Carnian genera
Late Triassic synapsids of South America
Triassic Argentina
Fossils of Argentina
 
Fossil taxa described in 1962
Anomodont genera